Aasif Hakim Mandviwala (born March 5, 1966), known professionally as Aasif Mandvi, is a British-American actor, comedian and author. He was a correspondent on The Daily Show from 2006 to 2017. Mandvi's other television work includes the HBO comedy series The Brink and the CBS/Paramount+ psychological drama Evil. His film roles include playing Mr. Aziz in Spider-Man 2 and Commander Zhao in The Last Airbender, and his stage work includes appearing on Broadway as Ali Hakim in Oklahoma!.

Early life
Mandvi was born in Bombay (now Mumbai), Maharashtra, India, to a Dawoodi Bohra Muslim family. His family moved to England, settling, when he was a year old, in the West Yorkshire city of Bradford. His father, Hakim, who had originally come to work in textiles research at Bradford University, later ran a corner shop, while his mother, Fatima, was a nurse. Mandvi attended the independent Woodhouse Grove School, and he identifies himself as a "working-class kid from Bradford". In the early 80s, his father grew frustrated with Margaret Thatcher's administration and moved his family to Tampa, Florida, United States when Mandvi was 16. He attended Chamberlain High School.

Career

Early
After graduating from the University of South Florida with a degree in theatre, Mandvi worked as a performer at Disney-MGM Studios at Walt Disney World Resort. He later moved to New York City, where he began appearing in off-Broadway productions. During this time, he was active in the band Cowboys and Indian. He won an Obie Award for his one-man show Sakina's Restaurant.

On Broadway, Mandvi appeared as Ali Hakim in the 2002 production  of Oklahoma! directed by Trevor Nunn. He also appeared in the play Homebody/Kabul by Tony Kushner. He portrayed Fritz Haber in the off-Broadway play Einstein's Gift.

Mandvi played Melchior in On the Razzle by Tom Stoppard at the Williamstown Theatre Festival and appeared in the docudrama Guantanamo: Honor Bound to Defend Freedom at the Culture Project. In 2012 Mandvi starred in Disgraced at Lincoln Center's Claire Tow Theater. He played the lead role of Amir, a Pakistani American lawyer struggling with his identity and Islam in the drama by Ayad Akhtar. The play went on to win the 2013 Pulitzer Prize for Drama. Mandvi was nominated for a Lucille Lortel Award for his role.

Television
Mandvi made his television debut as a doorman at the Miami Biltmore Hotel in the episode "Line of Fire" of the series Miami Vice. He has appeared in television shows including ER, The Sopranos, Sex and the City, CSI, Oz, Ed, The Bedford Diaries, Jericho, Sleeper Cell and various editions of Law & Order, including Criminal Intent, Special Victims Unit and Trial by Jury. He was the book reader for audio editions of Salman Rushdie's Shalimar the Clown (2005) and V. S. Naipaul's Magic Seeds (2004). In 2011 he appeared in Taco Bell commercials.

In 2006, Mandvi auditioned for The Daily Show. He was hired immediately and appeared on the show the same day. Mandvi became a regular correspondent in 2007. He often appears in segments satirizing and commenting on Islamic, Middle-Eastern, and South-Asian-related issues with such titles as "Senior Asian Correspondent," "Senior Middle East Correspondent," "Senior Foreign Looking Correspondent," and "Senior Muslim Correspondent."

In 2013, Mandvi was cast in a recurring role on the FOX romantic comedy, Us & Them.

In October 2013, during a segment on The Daily Show, Mandvi's interview with Don Yelton led to Yelton's resignation from the North Carolina Republican Party office.

Beginning in June 2015, Mandvi portrayed Rafiq Massoud in the HBO comedy series The Brink. Mandvi also served as a writer and co-producer on the series. In April 2015, Mandvi appeared on Person of Interest as Sulaiman Khan, the CEO of a software security firm. He was the lead actor, co-writer and producer of the web series Halal in the Family, which premiered on Funny or Die in 2015.

In 2016, Mandvi joined the climate change documentary show Years of Living Dangerously as one of its celebrity correspondents.

Beginning in 2017, Mandvi appeared in three episodes of the Netflix series A Series of Unfortunate Events as Montgomery "Uncle Monty" Montgomery, a herpetologist and distant relative of the Baudelaire children.

In 2019, Mandvi was cast in the Robert and Michelle King supernatural drama series Evil on CBS as Ben Shakir, a carpenter who works as a technical expert, equipment handler and debunker of supernatural phenomena.

Film
Mandvi played minor roles in the films The Siege and Die Hard with a Vengeance as well as the title role in Merchant Ivory Productions' film The Mystic Masseur. He had a major supporting role in the independent film American Chai, playing the lead character's roommate, "Engineering Sam." He played the doctor who diagnosed Paul Vitti's (Robert De Niro) panic attacks in Analyze This, and had a role as Mr. Aziz of "Joe's Pizza" in Spider-Man 2. He was also in commercials by Domino's Pizza and the Financial Industry Regulatory Authority (FINRA). He played the tone deaf doorman Khan in Music and Lyrics.

Mandvi played a dentist alongside Ricky Gervais in the 2008 romantic comedy Ghost Town, as well as office employee Bob Spaulding in The Proposal, starring Sandra Bullock. Today's Special, which Mandvi co-wrote with Jonathan Bines, premiered at the London Film Festival in October 2009 and New York's Mahindra Indo-American Arts Council Film Festival on November 11, 2009. He appeared in It's Kind of a Funny Story, a coming-of-age film written and directed by Anna Boden with Ryan Fleck, adapted from the 2006 novel by Ned Vizzini. He also co-starred as a Guantanamo captive in the film The Response, a script based on the transcripts of Combatant Status Review Tribunals convened in Guantanamo in 2004. In M. Night Shyamalan's The Last Airbender (released in 2010) he played a major role as Commander Zhao. Mandvi played the role of Mr. Chetty in the 2013 comedy The Internship and portrayed Ash Vasudevan in the 2014 film Million Dollar Arm.

Personal life
On August 27, 2017, Mandvi married his girlfriend of three years, Shaifali Puri, an author and humanitarian, at The Fox Theatre in Atlanta, GA. The interfaith ceremony (Puri is Hindu) was held in front of 220 guests comprising friends and family. On March 14, 2020, Puri gave birth to their son.

Mandvi has been diagnosed with chronic tinnitus.

Mandvi is the author of the book No Land's Man.

In June 2019, he was awarded an Honorary Doctor of Humane Letters Degree by the Macaulay Honors College after delivering the commencement speech that year.

Charity work
Mandvi is involved with disaster-relief organizations such as the charity initiative Relief 4 Pakistan, which assists in flood relief in Pakistan. In 2010, he hosted the "Stand Up for Religious Freedom" comedy event to raise money for the organization. After the 2010 Haiti earthquake, he performed with fellow Daily Show correspondent Wyatt Cenac at Conan O'Brien's "I'm with Coco" Benefit for earthquake victims. He is also a supporter of the Endometriosis Foundation of America.

Filmography

Actor

Film

Television
{| class=wikitable
|-
! Year!! Show !! Role !! Notes
|-
| 1988
|Miami Vice
| Doorman
| Episode: "Line of Fire"
|-
| rowspan=2|1995
|New York Undercover
| Omar
| Episode: "The Smoking Section"
|-
|The Cosby Mysteries
| Cabbie
| Episode: "Big Brother Is Watching"
|-
| 1995–1998
|Law & Order
| Peanut Vendor / Gulab Singh / Technician / Khan
| 4 episodes
|-
| rowspan=2|1996
|Jake's Women
| Driver
| Television film
|-
| Nash Bridges
| Aziz Kadim
| Episode: "Trackdown"
|-
| 1998
| Dellaventura
| Aasif
| Episode: "The Human Factor"
|-
| rowspan="3" |2000
|Welcome to New York
| Doorman
| Episode: "Jim Gets an Apartment"
|-
| Law & Order: Special Victims Unit
| Professor Husseini
| Episode: "Honor"
|-
|CSI: Crime Scene Investigation
|Dr. Leever
|Episode: "Anonymous"
|-
| 2001
|Sex and the City
| Dmitri
| Episode: "My Motherboard, My Self"
|-
| 2002
| Oz
|Dr. Faraj
| 2 episodes
|-
| 2003
| Ed
| Buyer
| Episode: "Goodbye Stuckeyville"
|-
| rowspan=2|2004
|Law & Order: Criminal Intent
| Sateesh
| Episode: "Inert Dwarf"
|-
|Tanner on Tanner
| Salim Barik
| 4 episodes
|-
| rowspan=3|2006
|Law & Order: Trial by Jury
|Judge Samir Patel
| Episode: "Bang & Blame, Baby Boom"
|-
| The Sopranos
|Dr. Abu Bilal
| Episode: "Kaisha"
|-
| Sleeper Cell
|Khalid
|Episode: "Al-Baqara"
|-
| 2006–2007
| ER
|Manish
|3 episodes
|-
| 2006–2008
| Jericho
|Dr. Kenchy Dhuwalia
|8 episodes
|-
| 2006–2015
| The Daily Show
|Himself
|188 episodes
|-
| 2010
| King of the Hill
|Mike Patel (voice)
|Episode: "When Joseph Met Lori, and Made Out with Her in the Janitor's Closet"
|-
| 2011
| Curb Your Enthusiasm
|Man in Elevator
|Episode: "Larry vs. Michael J. Fox"
|-
| 2014
| Us & Them
| Dave Coaches
| Episode: "Crunch & Brunch"
|-
| rowspan=5|2015
| Madam Secretary
| Prince Yousif Obaid
| Episode: "Chains of Command"
|-
| Person of Interest
| Suleiman Khan
| Episode: "Search and Destroy"
|-
| The Brink
| Rafiq Massoud
| 10 episodes; also producer and writer
|-
| Halal in the Family
| Aasif Qu'osby
| Web series
|-
| Jake and the Never Land Pirates
| Pirate Pharaoh (voice)
| 3 episodes
|-
| 2016–2019
| Elena of Avalor
| King Raja (voice)
| 2 episodes
|-
| 2016
| Another Period
| Parshwall
| Episode: "The Prince and the Pauper"
|-
| rowspan=4|2017
| Younger
| Jay Malick
| 4 episodes
|-
| Shut Eye
| Pazhani "Paz" Kapoor
| 6 episodes
|-
|National Geographic Explorer
| Host
| Season 10 Episode 2
|-
|The Problem with Apu
| Himself
| Documentary film
|-
| 2017–2018
| A Series of Unfortunate Events
| Dr. Montgomery Montgomery (Uncle Monty)
| 4 episodes
|-
| 2018
| Explained
| Narrator (voice)
| Episode: "Cricket, explained"
|-
| 2018–2020
| Blue Bloods
| Samar "Sam" Chatwal
| Recurring, season 9
|-
| 2019–present
| Evil
| Ben Shakir
| Main cast
|-
| rowspan=3|2019
| This Way Up
| Vish
| Main cast
|-
| Ghostwriter
|Bagheera (voice)
|2 episodes
|-
| Room 104
| Eugene Hill 
| Episode: "The Specimen Collector"
|-
| 2020
| The Boss Baby: Back in Business
| OCB Corporate Consultant (voice)
| Season 4: Episodes 6 & 10 - 12
|-
| 2020–2022
| Mira, Royal Detective
| Sahil (voice)
| 18 episodes
|-
| 2021
| Archer
| Cornelius Varma (voice)
| Episode: "London Time"
|-
| 2022–present
| Would I Lie to You? (USA)
| Host
| 
|-
|}

Writer

Stage

Actor

Writer

Radio drama/podcast

Actor

Published works
 The book has been adapted for the American-Indian-Bangladeshi film No Land's Man directed by Mostofa Sarwar Farooki.

References

External links

 Aasif Mandvi Dot Com, official website
 
 
 "A Man Called Mandvi", Nirali Magazine'', February 2007
 "This is you, America. Are you ok with it?" – Interview
 One on One – Aasif Mandvi – Interview with Al Jazeera English (video, 24:53 min.)

1966 births
Living people
20th-century American male actors
21st-century American male actors
Male actors from Bradford
American male comedians
American male film actors
American male stage actors
American male television actors
American Muslims
American male writers of Indian descent
Dawoodi Bohras
British Ismailis
American Ismailis
English emigrants to the United States
English Muslims
Indian emigrants to England
Male actors from Mumbai
Male actors from Tampa, Florida
American male actors of Indian descent
Muslim male comedians
People educated at Woodhouse Grove School
University of South Florida alumni
21st-century American memoirists
American dramatists and playwrights of Indian descent
21st-century Indian non-fiction writers
American male screenwriters
Comedians from Florida
American male non-fiction writers
Indian non-fiction writers
Screenwriters from Florida
Screenwriters from Mumbai
20th-century American comedians
21st-century American comedians
Indian comedians
American people of Gujarati descent
21st-century American screenwriters
Asia Game Changer Award winners
21st-century American male writers